Gypsy was an American progressive rock band from Minnesota, formed as The Underbeats (1962–1968). Gypsy was the house band at the Whisky a Go Go, West Hollywood, California from September 1969 to April 1971 and were known in 1970 for their US Billboard Hot 100 single "Gypsy Queen Part 1", which peaked at #62. The track "Dead And Gone" was played extensively on KSHE St. Louis, KADI St. Louis, and KWK St. Louis. Most of Gypsy's music was composed and written by guitarist and singer Enrico Rosenbaum. Drummer Bill Lordan went on to play with Sly & the Family Stone and a long career with Robin Trower. Keyboardist James Walsh continued the band in various incarnations as The James Walsh Gypsy Band. The James Walsh Gypsy Band had one Hot 100 entry in 1978 with, "Cuz, It's You Girl" which peaked at #71.

The group has no relation to the British band of the same name formed in 1968, who recorded two albums for United Artists Records in the UK.

Jim Johnson died of esophageal cancer in hospice care on September 26, 2019, at age 76. 
James '"Owl" Walsh died of congestive heart failure at his hospital in Edina, Minnesota on March 4, 2023 at age 74.

Discography

Albums
Gypsy (Metromedia, 1970)
In the Garden (Metromedia, 1971)
Antithesis (RCA, 1972)
Unlock the Gates (RCA, 1973)

Singles
"Gypsy Queen Part I" / "Dead and Gone", (Metromedia)
"Cuz, It's You Girl" / *Bring Yourself Around", (RCA)
"Day After Day" / "Lean on Me", (RCA)

The James Walsh Gypsy Band albums
The James Walsh Gypsy Band (1978, RCA)
20 Years Ago Today (1996, Metro)
Muscle Shoals 1979 (2008, Gypsy Family Productions)
I've Got The Feelin'  (2016, Preservation; P-Vine)

. last show in St. Louis, November 4, 2017 .

References

External links
 Official Gypsy website
 MinniePaul Music page for Gypsy
 Gypsy at Whisky a Go Go history page (see: 1969)

American progressive rock groups
Musical groups from Minnesota